The following is a list of the MTV Europe Music Award winners and nominees for Best Portuguese Act.

Winners and nominees
Winners are listed first and highlighted in bold.

2000s

2010s

2020s

References

MTV Europe Music Awards
Portuguese music awards
Awards established in 2003